The Lihir mine is one of the largest gold mines in Papua New Guinea and in the world. The mine is located in the north-east of the country in New Ireland Province. The mine has estimated reserves of 45 million oz of gold.

References 

Gold mines in Papua New Guinea